Donna Carmino (born 1957) is a Trinidadian former cricketer. She appeared in one match for International XI at the 1973 Women's Cricket World Cup, against England. Batting at 7, she scored 0 runs.

References

External links
 
 

1957 births
Living people
Trinidad and Tobago women cricketers
West Indian women cricketers
International XI women One Day International cricketers